Ogan or Oğan may refer to the following people
Given name

Surname
Alain Saint-Ogan (1895–1974), French comics author and artist
Billy Ogan (born 1966), Thai actor and singer-songwriter
Cathal mac Ógán, Medieval Gael from Ireland 
Henrietta Ogan, Nigerian business administrator
İsmail Ogan (1933–2022), Turkish wrestler 
Sarah Ogan Gunning (1910–1983), American singer-songwriter 
Scott Ogan (born 1952), American politician and businessman 
Sinan Oğan (born 1967), Turkish politician